Taher Ahmadzadeh Heravi (1921 – 30 November 2017) was an Iranian nationalist-religious political activist who held office as the first governor of Khorasan Province after the Iranian Revolution.

Early life and education
Ahmadzadeh was of Afghan descent. His father was a wealthy Shia from the city of Herat, Afghanistan who migrated to Iran. Ahmadzadeh studied secondary education and was considered a small landowner in his birthplace Mashhad.

Career
Ahmadzadeh was an active opposition to Pahlavi dynasty since the early 1950s and hailed as the "symbol of heroic resistance against SAVAK", spending 10 years in prison under the regime. Considered a well-known nationalist and a prominent leader in Mashhad, he co-founded a Mossadeghist and religious organization called the 'Center for the Publication of Islamic Truths' along with Mohammad-Taqi Shariati, father of Ali Shariati. He joined National Front's 'National Resistance Movement' in Khorasan after the 1953 coup d'état and served as a member of central committee of its provincial branch, though not affiliated with any particular political party. Working closely with Mehdi Bazargan for almost four decades, he also helped him found the Freedom Movement of Iran.

After Iranian Revolution in 1979, Bazargan nominated him as the governor of Khorasan Province. Ahmadzadeh initially rejected the appointment, on the grounds that Ruhollah Khomeini has installed Abbas Vaez-Tabasi as the costudian of Astan Quds Razavi and he should maintain the former position as well. He was ousted soon after resignation of Bazargan. According to Ervand Abrahamian, he was tagged "liberal" and a "sympathizer of the Mojahedin" at the time.

In June 1981, he started to openly criticizing the clergy for "monopolizing power". Sobsequently, Ahmadzadeh was imprisoned in Evin Prison and in 1983 he was forced to confess in a televised program called "roundtable discussions". He was released four years later. Ahmadzadeh was detained again in 2000, when he was 80.

Personal life
His sons Masoud and Majid, as well as his daughter Mastureh were among leading members of the Organization of Iranian People's Fedai Guerrillas. His youngest son, Mojtaba, was a sympathizer of the People's Mujahedin of Iran and was executed during 1988 executions of Iranian political prisoners.

References

1921 births
2017 deaths
Iranian people of Afghan descent
People from Mashhad
National Front (Iran) politicians
Freedom Movement of Iran politicians
Iranian religious-nationalists
Members of the National Council for Peace